Founded in the year 1846, St. Peter's College, Agra is one of the oldest convent schools in India. The students are commonly referred to as Peterians. It is a Roman Catholic Institution granted Minority Rights under Article 30 of the Indian Constitution. It is located east of Paliwal Park and opposite the commercial district of Sanjay Place on Wazirpura road, Agra. The school is accredited under the Indian Certificate of Secondary Education board for grade 10th and under the Indian School Certificate board for Grade 12.

History
 1870 : Affiliated to Calcutta University. First Entrance Examination conducted. Title of College added.
 1946 : Celebrated 100 years of its existence.
 1963 : New block built (presently hosts the middle section).
 1963 : Adopts Indian Certificate of Secondary Education system.
 1966 : Head of institution changed from Rector to Principal.
 1977 : Adopts the Indian School Certificate for Grade 12.
 1984 : Boarding facility discontinued. St. Peter's College becomes full-time day-scholar system of education.
 1996 : Celebrates sesquicentennial anniversary of 150 years of existence.
 2003 : Construction changes, with 33 rooms, an administrative block and a multipurpose hall constructed.
 2012 : Completed entrance construction.
 2016 : Celebrated Athletic Meet.
 2018 : Renovated Senior Wing
 2019 : Administrative block in construction
 2021 : New Administrative block is completed.
 2021 : College celebrates 175 years of its founding.

Alumni
Neeraj Kapoor, Awarded India's Greatest Brand Builder, currently he is Founder - Startup Business Academy
Daya Kishore Hazra, an Indian medical doctor
Josh Malihabadi, Poet, Indian Freedom fighter
Abrar Hasan khan (Asar Malihabadi) Poet, Sarbrahkar Nanpara, Health Minister Hyderabad

photo

References

External links
 Official website

Catholic schools in India
Primary schools in Uttar Pradesh
High schools and secondary schools in Uttar Pradesh
Christian schools in Uttar Pradesh
Education in Agra
Educational institutions established in 1846
1846 establishments in India